Mihara may refer to:

People
Mihara (surname)

Places
Mihara, Hiroshima, a city in Hiroshima Prefecture
Mihara Station, a railway station in Mihara, Hiroshima
Mihara Castle, a castle that was located in Mihara, Hiroshima
Mihara, Hyōgo, a former town in Hyōgo Prefecture
Mihara District, Hyōgo, a former district in Hyōgo Prefecture
Mihara, Kōchi, a village in Kōchi Prefecture
Mihara, Osaka, a former town in Osaka Prefecture
Mount Mihara, a volcano on Izu Ōshima